Vittorio Marcelli (born 3 June 1944) is a former Italian road cyclist. As an amateur he won one gold and three bronze medals at the world championship and Summer Olympic in 1967–68. After that he turned professional and rode the 1970 Tour de France.

References

1944 births
Living people
Italian male cyclists
Cyclists at the 1968 Summer Olympics
Olympic cyclists of Italy
Olympic bronze medalists for Italy
Olympic medalists in cycling
Sportspeople from the Province of L'Aquila
Cyclists from Abruzzo
Medalists at the 1968 Summer Olympics